Middlesbrough F.C. Reserves and Academy  are the under-23 and under-18 teams of Middlesbrough F.C.

Most home fixtures are played at Rockliffe Park, near Hurworth, though some are played at Victoria Park, Hartlepool.

Reserves
Middlesbrough Reserves (also referred to as the Under-23 Development Squad) play in Division 2 of the Premier League 2, being part of the founding members of the Premier League 2 since 2012. They have also competed in the EFL Trophy during the 2016–17, 2017–18 and 2018–19 seasons alongside 15 other academies that held Category 1 status.

Current squad

Out on loan

Academy

The Middlesbrough Academy is the name for Middlesbrough's youth system. They field teams in the U21 Premier League and U18 Premier League.

The longest serving academy manager was Dave Parnaby, who was appointed in 1998 and retired in 2017. During this time, the academy produced many notable players such as former first team captains Ben Gibson and Jonathan Woodgate; Australia internationals  Brad Jones, Luke Wilkshire and Rhys Williams; Scotland internationals James Morrison, Graeme Murty and Robbie Stockdale; England internationals Stewart Downing and Adam Johnson; as well as Northern Ireland international Chris Brunt.

He also led the Academy side to the 2003 FA Youth Cup final against Manchester United where they finished runners up, before getting to the final again the next season and emerging victorious over Aston Villa in 2004.

Current squad

Staff 
The Middlesbrough football club academy staff are as follows:

Senior Staff

Medical

Fitness and Performance

Scouting

Coaching staff
Because of Middlesbrough Football Clubs Academies EPP level they divide their coaching into three phases. Professional development, youth development and foundation phases of coaching.

Notable products
Many players have come through Middlesbrough's academy who have either gone on to play for the first team or have gone on to have successful careers elsewhere. The following are players who have made professional appearances, either for Middlesbrough or another football club, during their careers.

They are organised in order of the date they signed their first professional contract with Middlesbrough (from 1997 onwards). Appearances for those who played for Middlesbrough are counted as all professional appearances for the club in all competitions. Players who are still contracted to the club (including players loaned out elsewhere) are highlighted in bold.

Players who have played for Middlesbrough

Players who have played for other football clubs

Players who have played at international level
Many players who have come through the youth ranks at Middlesbrough have appeared for their national team at both senior and youth levels. The following is a list of those players organised by national team and alphabetical order respectively.

Honours

FA Youth Cup
Winners (1): 2003–04
Runners-up (2): 1989–90, 2002–03
Professional U18 Development League
Winners (1): 2014–15
North Riding Senior Cup
Winners (11): 1996–97, 2000–01, 2001–02, 2003–04, 2006–07, 2007–08, 2008–09, 2011–12, 2014–15, 2015–16, 2017–18
Runners-up (1): 2003–04, 2004–05, 2013–14
The Central League
Winners (1): 2011–12
Runners-up (2): 1995–96, 2010–11
Central League Cup
Winners (1): 2014–15

References

Reserves and Academy
Football clubs in North Yorkshire
Football academies in England
Teesside Football League
North Eastern League
North Regional League
1876 establishments in England
Association football clubs established in 1876
Premier League International Cup
UEFA Youth League teams